Soldatenko is a Ukrainian-language surname. Notable people with the surname include:

Veniamin Soldatenko
Rostislav Soldatenko

See also

Ukrainian-language surnames